Suwu may refer to:

Subu people, a Cameroonian ethnic group, also known as Suwu people
Suwu language, a language used by Subu people
Suwu, Gansu (苏武), a town in Minqin County, Gansu, China

See also
Su Wu (140BC - 60BC), Han dynasty diplomat